San Cebrián de Mudá is a municipality located in the province of Palencia, Castile and León, Spain. 

According to the 2004 census (INE), the municipality had a population of 185 inhabitants.

The local economy formerly relied on coal mining and, given the decline of the industry, there have been investments to encourage tourism as an alternative.

Buildings
The church is Romanesque in origin.

Ecology
The landscape has been affected by coal mining, but is now protected as part of the Montaña Palentina Natural Park.
There is a centre for European Bison in the municipality.

References

Municipalities in the Province of Palencia